The 1950 National Invitation Tournament was the 1950 edition of the annual NCAA college basketball competition. For the only time in history, the same school won both the NIT and NCAA tournaments as CCNY took both championships, beating Bradley in both finals.  Four participants in the 1950 NIT (Bradley, CCNY, Kentucky and Long Island University) were later implicated in the CCNY point shaving scandal.

Selected teams
Below is a list of the 12 teams selected for the tournament.

 Arizona
 Bradley
 CCNY
 Duquesne
 Kentucky
 La Salle
 Long Island
 Niagara
 St. John's
 San Francisco
 Syracuse
 Western Kentucky

Bracket
Below is the tournament bracket.

See also
 1950 NCAA basketball tournament
 1950 NAIA Basketball Tournament

References

National Invitation
National Invitation Tournament
1950s in Manhattan
Basketball in New York City
College sports in New York City
Madison Square Garden
National Invitation Tournament
National Invitation Tournament
Sports competitions in New York City
Sports in Manhattan